Eugene F. Bannigan (December 16, 1911 – July 4, 1958) was an American lawyer and politician from New York.

Life
He was born on December 16, 1911, in Brooklyn, New York City. He attended St. Theresa's Parochial School and Xavier High School. He graduated from Manhattan College and St. John's University School of Law. He was admitted to the bar, practiced law in Brooklyn, and entered politics as a Democrat.

Bannigan was a member of the New York State Assembly from 1941 until his death in 1958, sitting in the 163rd, 164th, 165th, 166th, 167th, 168th, 169th, 170th and 171st New York State Legislatures. He was Minority Leader from 1953 to 1958.

He died on July 4, 1958, of heart disease.

Sources

1911 births
1958 deaths
Politicians from Brooklyn
Democratic Party members of the New York State Assembly
St. John's University School of Law alumni
Manhattan College alumni
Xavier High School (New York City) alumni
20th-century American politicians